John Calum Macdonald Gillies  FRSE is a medical doctor who worked as general practitioner (GP) and who is the Depute Director of the Scottish School of Primary Care.  He was formerly the chair of the Scottish Council of the Royal College of General Practitioners (RCGP) from November 2010 to November 2014.

Early career
Gillies was born in North Uist, Scotland. He studied at the University of Edinburgh, qualifying in medicine in 1975. Gilles travelled to Africa, working as a District Medical Officer in Ntcheu District Hospital, Malawi for 3 years. He gained his Membership of the Royal College of Physicians (MRCP) in 1978.

General principal
Gillies returned to the United Kingdom and trained in general practice, gaining his Membership of the Royal College of General Practitioners (MRCGP) in 1985. From 1985 he worked as a GP principal in Glenluce, Wigtownshire. He then moved to Selkirk in the Scottish Borders in 1996 where he worked for the 16 years in until he retired from clinical practise in 2012. During the latter part of this time he was working as a GP trainer.

Academic GP
Gillies was a Honorary Senior Lecturer at the University of Edinburgh. He was one of the authors of Distilling the Essence of General Practice which looked at the important and unique advantages of general practice and the development of primary care throughout the UK. Gillies was involved with education initiatives in Africa. He is an associate member of the University of Edinburgh's Global Health Academy. Gillies is on the members advisory board of the Wesleyan Assurance Society. He was chair of the Reference Group of the Scottish Government Health Department's Out of Hours Primary Care Review that reported in 2015. He chaired a group that looked into undergraduate medical education in Scotland that reported in 2019.

Gilles was involved with an initiative that presented a book of poems Tools of the Trade to every newly qualified doctor in Scotland.

RCGP Scotland chair
Gilles was elected by the members of RCGP's Scottish Council to be chair, taking up the position in November 2010. His priorities as chair were to promote generalism and leadership in general practice. During his time as chair of RCGP's Scottish council he spoke out about health inequalities and about the support needed for GP practices to improve quality. In October 2013 he travelled to the Western Isles to unveil a memorial to a dedicated family of doctors. In November 2013 his chairmanship was extended for another year. He delivered a petition to the office of First Minister, signed by 21,000 Scots calling for further resources to be put towards general practice. He was succeeded by Miles Mack in November 2014.

Awards and honours
Gillies was appointed Officer of the Order of the British Empire (OBE) in the 2016 New Year Honours for services to general practice. In 2018 he was elected a Fellow of the Royal Society of Edinburgh.

Personal life
He is married to Mary, who is now retired from working as a GP, and they have two children together.

References

External links
profile at University of Edinburgh

Living people
People from Uist
20th-century Scottish medical doctors
21st-century Scottish medical doctors
Scottish general practitioners
Fellows of the Royal College of General Practitioners
Fellows of the Royal College of Physicians of Edinburgh
Alumni of the University of Edinburgh
Academics of the University of Edinburgh
Officers of the Order of the British Empire
Year of birth missing (living people)